Benzonatate, sold under the brand name Tessalon among others, is a medication that reduces cough and hiccups. It is taken by mouth. Use is not recommended in those under the age of ten. Effects generally begin within 20 minutes and last up to eight hours.

Side effects include sleepiness, dizziness, headache, upset stomach, skin rash, hallucinations, and allergic reactions. Excessive doses may cause seizures, irregular heartbeat, and death. Chewing or sucking on the capsule can lead to laryngospasm, bronchospasm, and circulatory collapse. It is unclear if use in pregnancy or breastfeeding is safe. It works by numbing stretch receptors in the lungs and suppressing the cough reflex in the brain.

Benzonatate was approved for medical use in the United States in 1958. It is available as a generic medication. Availability worldwide is limited. In 2020, it was the 157th most commonly prescribed medication in the United States, with more than 3million prescriptions.

Medical uses

Cough 
Benzonatate is a prescription non-opioid alternative for the symptomatic relief of cough. It has been shown to improve cough associated with a variety of respiratory conditions including asthma, bronchitis, pneumonia, tuberculosis, pneumothorax, opiate-resistant cough in lung cancer, and emphysema.

Benzonatate also reduces the consistency and volume of sputum production associated with cough in those with chronic obstructive pulmonary disorder (COPD).

Compared to codeine, benzonatate has been shown to be more effective in reducing the frequency of induced cough in experiments.

Benzonatate does not treat the underlying cause of the cough.

Hiccups 
Benzonatate has been shown to have use in the suppression of hiccups.

Intubation 
Benzonatate acts as a local anesthetic and the liquid inside the capsule can be applied in the mouth to numb the oropharynx for awake intubation. However, there can be life-threatening adverse effects when the medication is absorbed by the oral mucosa, including choking, hypersensitivity reactions, and circulatory collapse.

Contraindications 
Hypersensitivity to benzonatate or any related compounds is a contraindication to its administration.

Side effects
Benzonatate is generally well-tolerated if the liquid-capsule is swallowed intact. Potential adverse effects to benzonatate include:

 Constipation, dizziness, fatigue, stuffy nose, nausea, headache are frequently reported.
 Sedation, a feeling of numbness in the chest, sensation of burning in the eyes, a vague "chilly" sensation, itchiness, and rashes are also possible.
 Ingestion of a small handful of capsules has caused seizures, cardiac arrhythmia, and death in adults.

Hypersensitivity reactions 
Benzonatate is structurally related to anesthetic medications of the para-aminobenzoic acid (PABA) class which includes procaine and tetracaine. Procaine and tetracaine, previously used heavily in the fields of dentistry and anesthesiology, have fallen out of favor due to allergies associated with their metabolites. Similarly, severe hypersensitivity reactions to benzonatate have been reported and include symptoms of laryngospasm, bronchospasm, and cardiovascular collapse. These reactions are possibly associated with chewing, sucking, or crushing the capsule in the mouth.

Improper use 
Benzonatate should be swallowed whole. Crushing or sucking on the liquid-filled capsule, or "softgel," will cause release of benzonatate from the capsule and can produce a temporary local anesthesia of the oral mucosa. Rapid development of numbness of the tongue and choking can occur. In severe cases, excessive absorption can lead to laryngospasm, bronchospasm, seizures, and circulatory collapse. This may be due to a hypersensitivity reaction to benzonatate or a systemic local anesthetic toxicity, both of which have similar symptoms. There is a potential for these adverse effects to occur at a therapeutic dose, that is, a single capsule, if chewed or sucked on in the mouth.

Psychiatric effects 
Isolated cases of bizarre behavior, mental confusion, and visual hallucinations have been reported during concurrent use with other prescribed medications. Central nervous system effects associated with other para-aminobenozic acid (PABA) derivative local anesthetics, for example procaine or tetracaine, could occur with benzonatate and should be considered.

Children 
Safety and efficacy in children below the age of 10 have not been established. Accidental ingestion resulting in death has been reported in children below the age of 10. Benzonatate may be attractive to children due to its appearance, a round-shaped liquid-filled gelatin capsule, which looks like candy. Chewing or sucking of a single capsule can cause death of a small child. Signs and symptoms can occur rapidly after ingestion (within 15–20 minutes) and include restlessness, tremors, convulsions, coma, and cardiac arrest. Death has been reported within one hour of ingestion.

Pregnancy and breast feeding 
In the U.S., benzonatate is classified by the U.S. Food and Drug Administration (FDA) as pregnancy category C. It is not known if benzonatate can cause fetal harm to a pregnant woman or if it can affect reproduction capacity. Animal reproductive studies have not yet been conducted with benzonatate to evaluate its teratogenicity. Benzonatate should only be given to a pregnant woman if it is clearly needed.

It is not known whether benzonatate is excreted in human milk. It is recommended to exercise caution when benzonatate is given to a nursing woman.

Overdose 
Benzonatate is chemically similar to other local anesthetics such as tetracaine and procaine, and shares their pharmacology and toxicology.

Benzonatate overdose is characterized by symptoms of restlessness, tremors, seizures, abnormal heart rhythms (cardiac arrhythmia), cerebral edema, absent breathing (apnea), fast heart beat (tachycardia), and in severe cases, coma and death. Symptoms develop rapidly, typically within 1 hour of ingestion. Treatment focuses on removal of gastric contents and on managing symptoms of sedation, convulsions, apnea, and cardiac arrhythmia.

Despite a long history of safe and appropriate usage, the safety margin of benzonatate is reportedly narrow. Toxicity above the therapeutic dose is relatively low and ingestion of a small handful of pills can cause symptoms of overdose. Children are at an increased risk for toxicity, which have occurred with administration of only one or two capsules.

Due to increasing usage of benzonatate and rapid onset of symptoms, there are accumulating cases of benzonatate overdose deaths, especially in children.

Pharmacology
Benzonatate is chemically similar to other local anesthetics such as tetracaine and procaine, and shares their pharmacology.

Mechanism of action 
Similar to other local anesthetics, benzonatate is a potent voltage-gated sodium channel inhibitor. After absorption and circulation to the respiratory tract, benzonatate acts as a local anesthetic, decreasing the sensitivity of vagal afferent fibers and stretch receptors in the bronchi, alveoli, and pleura in the lower airway and lung. This damps their activity and reduces the cough reflex. Benzonatate also has central antitussive activity on the cough center in central nervous system at the level of the medulla. However, there is minimal inhibition of the respiratory center at a therapeutic dosage.

Pharmacokinetics 
The antitussive effect of benzonatate begins within 15 to 20 minutes after oral administration and typically lasts between 3 and 8 hours.

Benzonatate is hydrolyzed by plasma butyrylcholinesterase (BChE) to the metabolite 4-(butylamino)benzoic acid (BABA) as well as polyethylene glycol monomethyl esters. Like many other local anesthetic esters, the hydrolysis of the parent compound is rapid. There are concerns that those with pseudocholinesterase deficiencies may have an increased sensitivity to benzonatate as this hydrolysis is impaired, leading to increased levels of circulating medication.

Chemical structure
Benzonatate is a butylamine, structurally related to other polyglycol ester local anesthetics such as procaine and tetracaine. The molecular weight of benzonatate is 603.7 g/mol. However, the reference standard for benzonatate is a mixture of n-ethoxy compounds, differing in the abundance of 7-9 repeating units, with an average molecular weight of 612.23 g/mol. There is also evidence that the compound is not uniform between manufacturers.

Society and culture 
Benzonatate was first made available in the U.S. in 1958 as a prescription medication for the treatment of cough in individuals over the age of 10. There are a variety of prescription opioid-based cough relievers, such as hydrocodone and codeine, but have unwanted side effects and potential of abuse and diversion. However, benzonatate is currently the only prescription non-opioid antitussive and its usage has been rapidly increasing. The exact reasons of this increase are unclear.

Economics 
In the United States between 2004 and 2009, prescriptions increased 50% from 3.1 million to 4.7 million, the market share of benzonatate among antitussives increased from 6.3% to 13%, and the estimated number of children under the age of 10 years receiving benzonatate increased from 10,000 to 19,000. Throughout this same period, greater than 90% of prescriptions were given to those 18 or older. The majority of prescriptions were given by general, family, internal, and osteopathic physicians with pediatricians account for about 3% of prescribed benzonatate.

In 2020, it was the 157th most commonly prescribed medication in the United States, with more than 3million prescriptions.

Brand names 
Tessalon is a brand name version of benzonatate manufactured by Pfizer, Inc. It is available as perles or capsules. Zonatuss was a brand name manufactured by Atley Pharmaceuticals, Inc. and Vertical Pharmaceuticals, Inc.

References

External links
 

4-Aminobenzoate esters
Antitussives
Ethers
Local anesthetics
Wikipedia medicine articles ready to translate